The 1999 America East Conference baseball tournament was held from May 21 through 23 at Frawley Stadium in Wilmington, Delaware.  The top four regular season finishers of the league's eight teams qualified for the double-elimination tournament.  In the championship game, second-seeded Delaware defeated first-seeded Towson, 6-3, to win its second consecutive and fourth overall tournament championship.  As a result, Delaware received the America East's automatic bid to the 1999 NCAA Tournament.

Seeding
The top four finishers from the regular season were seeded one through four based on conference winning percentage only.  They then played in a double-elimination format.  In the first round, the one and four seeds were matched up in one game, while the two and three seeds were matched up in the other.

Results

All-Tournament Team
The following players were named to the All-Tournament Team.

Most Outstanding Player
Delaware pitcher Bryan Porcelli was named Most Outstanding Player.

References

America East Conference Baseball Tournament
1999 America East Conference baseball season
America East Conference baseball tournament
America East Conference baseball tournament
College baseball tournaments in Delaware
Sports competitions in Wilmington, Delaware